George Pierce was an American backstage doorman. He was honored the Special Tony Award at the 2nd Tony Awards.

References 

Year of birth missing
Year of death missing
American theatre people
Special Tony Award recipients